Stephen Craig West FRS (born 11 April 1952) is a British biochemist and molecular biologist specialising in research on DNA recombination and repair. He is known for pioneering studies on genome instability diseases including cancer. West obtained his BSc in 1974, and his PhD in 1977, both from Newcastle University. He is currently a Principal Group Leader at the Francis Crick Institute in London. He is an honorary Professor at University College London, and at Imperial College London. In recognition of his work he was awarded the Louis-Jeantet Prize for Medicine in 2007, is a fellow of the Royal Society, the Academy of Medical Sciences, an International Member of the National Academy of Sciences, and an International Honorary Member of the American Academy of Arts and Sciences. He received the 2022 Royal Medal for 'discovering and determining the functions of key enzymes that are essential for DNA recombination, repair and the maintenance of genomes'.

Early life and education
Stephen West was born on 11 April 1952 in Hessle, Yorkshire, to Joseph Clair West, a fishbuyer, and Louise West. Although he came from a working-class background, he did well enough at his local school (Hessle High School) to go to Newcastle University where he studied Biochemistry. He graduated with a BSc in 1974, and stayed in Newcastle to complete his PhD in 1977. His thesis advisor was Peter Emmerson.

Career
During his PhD work, he became interested in how cells recombine their DNA and use recombination for DNA repair. In 1977, he identified ‘protein X’ as the elusive RecA protein, which is essential for recombination and repair in bacteria. After finishing his PhD, which he completed within three years, he moved to the United States to join the group led by Paul Howard-Flanders, one of the early pioneers in the field of DNA repair. In 1985, West moved back to the United Kingdom and established his own group at the Imperial Cancer Research Fund's laboratories in South Mimms in Hertfordshire, which subsequently became known as Cancer Research UK. His colleagues at Clare Hall laboratory included the Nobel Prize winners Tim Hunt and Tomas Lindahl. In 2016, his laboratory moved to the new Francis Crick Institute in London.

Research

Highlights of research 
In the Howard-Flanders group at Yale University, West purified and characterised RecA protein, and in doing so discovered many key aspects relating to the way that cells mediate DNA-DNA interactions and strand exchange. Parallel studies were carried out in the groups of Charles Radding (also at Yale University) and Robert Lehman (Stanford University). These three laboratories provided the groundwork for our current understanding of the enzymatic mechanisms of recombination.

After moving to the UK in 1985, West continued his work in bacterial systems, and set about trying to identify cellular proteins capable of resolving recombination intermediates. He identified RuvC as the first cellular enzyme that resolves recombination intermediates and characterised how this nuclease cuts Holliday junctions. He was also the first to show that RuvA and RuvB are motor proteins that mediate Holliday junction branch migration. His biochemical studies were compounded by genetic work from the laboratory of Robert Lloyd (University of Nottingham).

West’s laboratory then moved into eukaryotic systems, where he discovered eukaryotic Holliday junction resolvases (yeast Yen1 and human GEN1).  The identification of GEN1 was the culmination of 18 years of research, and opened up the field to allow a genetic analysis of the pathways by which recombination intermediates are processed. Present understanding indicates that there are three distinct pathways of Holliday junction processing in human cells involving BLM-topoIIIα-RMI1-RMI2, MUS81-EME1 and GEN1. His laboratory discovered that the Holliday junction resolvase activities of MUS81 and GEN1 are regulated so that they act late in the cell cycle to ensure chromosome segregation.

In addition to the discovery of cellular Holliday junction resolvases, West was the first to purify the human RAD51 protein (the eukaryotic ortholog of RecA), and to show that it promotes homologous pairing and strand exchange reactions similar to those mediated by RecA. In addition, he purified and then visualised the BRCA2 breast cancer tumour suppressor, showing that it acts as a molecular chaperone for the association RAD51 with DNA. His laboratory also discovered that Aprataxin, which is defective in a progressive neurological disorder known as Oculomotor apraxia, is a 5'-deadenylase that removes AMP from 5'-termini following abortive DNA ligation.

As it is clear that DNA repair plays a critical role in the maintenance of genome stability and cancer avoidance, West’s work is significant in terms of understanding the molecular basis of human disease. He is in great demand as an international speaker, and gives several keynote lectures each year as a fine communicator of the intricacies of DNA recombination and repair.

Other professional activities 
West is on the editorial boards of a number of journals including e-Life (2014-2016), EMBO Journal (1996-2020) and EMBO Reports (2000-2022).

He has been a member of the Scientific Advisory Board of the Leibniz Institute on Aging, Fritz Lippman Institute, Jena, Germany, and is currently on the SABs of the Center for Chromosome Instability, University of Copenhagen, Denmark, the China Medical University (Taiwan), the Guangdong Key Laboratory of Genome Stability in Shenzen, China, and the Max Planck Institute for Biochemistry, Martinsreid, Germany.

He is a serial conference organiser, having organised (or co-organised) more than 30 conferences throughout his career. Currently, he is the organiser of the biennial International Conference on ‘Mechanisms of Recombination’. The next meeting in the series will take place in Portugal in July 2023.

Honours and awards
West has been recognised on a number of occasions for his research:
 2022: Royal Medal
 2021: Elected as International Honorary Member of the American Academy of Arts and Sciences.
 2018: Lifetime Achievement in Cancer Research Prize awarded by Cancer Research UK 
 2016: Elected as an International Member of the National Academy of Sciences (USA)
 2012: The Genetics Society Medal
 2011: Elected as a Fellow of the European Academy of Cancer Sciences
 2010: GlaxoSmithKline Prize and Medal of the Royal Society
 2009: Swiss Bridge Prize for Cancer Research 
 2008: Novartis Prize and Medal of the Royal Society
 2007: Louis-Jeantet Prize for Medicine (2007)
 2002: Leeuwenhoek Lecture award of the Royal Society
 2001: Swiss Bridge Prize for Cancer Research
 2000: Elected as a Fellow of the Academy of Medical Sciences
 1995: Elected as a Fellow of the Royal Society
 1994: Elected as a member of the European Molecular Biology Organization

Publications 
West has published over 260 papers which have been cited more than 37,000 times. He has a H-index of 113.

References

External links
 Biography of Stephen C. West by Paul Gabrielsen
 West lab website
 Royal Society Lecture on ‘DNA repair, protecting the blueprint for life'

1952 births
Living people
Fellows of the Royal Society
British biochemists
Scientists from Kingston upon Hull
Foreign associates of the National Academy of Sciences
Academics of the Francis Crick Institute